The Student and Schoolmate was a 19th-century monthly American children's magazine. It was the product of a merger of the children's magazines, The Student and The Schoolmate in 1855. In an 1860 advertisement seeking subscriptions at the price of $1 per year, the publishers reported it had nearly 15,000 subscribers, a figure it said was unmatched by any comparable U.S. publication. Its monthly features including a declamation, that is, a text annotated to instruct the student in delivering an oral presentation, and a piece of music for singing.

The magazine went through various name changes: The Student and Schoolmate (November 1855 – 1865); The Student and Schoolmate, and Forrester’s Boy's and Girl's Magazine (1865–1866); The Student and Schoolmate (1866–1871); and The Schoolmate (1872).

Boys' book writer William Taylor Adams, who wrote under the pen name Oliver Optic, edited the magazine between 1858 and 1862. He published some of his boys' books as serials in its pages. Several of Horatio Alger, Jr.'s boys' books were first published as serials in the magazine, in twelve installments from January to December, including the bestselling of his works, Ragged Dick (1867), as well as Fame and Fortune (1868), Rough and Ready (1869), Rufus and Rose (1870), Paul the Peddler (1871), and Slow and Sure (1872).

Notes

References

Additional sources

Magazines established in 1855
Magazines disestablished in 1872
Children's magazines published in the United States
Monthly magazines published in the United States
Defunct magazines published in the United States